South Carolina Highway 102 (SC 102) is a  state highway in the U.S. state of South Carolina. The highway connects North Hartsville and Chesterfield, via Patrick. It is designated as an east–west highway (with its official eastern terminus in North Hartsville) though it travels north and south.

Route description
SC 102 begins at an intersection with U.S. Route 15 Business (US 15 Bus.; North 5th Street) in North Hartsville, within Darlington County, where the roadway continues as Patrick Highway. It travels to the north-northeast and leaves the city limits of the city. It travels through rural areas of the county. Then, it crosses over Cedar Creek, where it enters Chesterfield County. SC 102 curves to the north-northwest for a short while before traveling in a fairly northerly direction. Just before entering Patrick, the highway goes through Sand Hills State Forest. In town is an intersection with US 1 (Main Street). It winds its way through rural areas of the county until it meets its northern terminus, an intersection with SC 9 (East Boulevard) in Chesterfield, where the roadway continues as South Craig Street.

Major intersections

See also

References

External links

SC 102 at Virginia Highways' South Carolina Highways Annex

102
Transportation in Darlington County, South Carolina
Transportation in Chesterfield County, South Carolina
Chesterfield, South Carolina